Stu Calver was a British musician who died in October 2000 at the age of 54. He is best known for his work as a backing vocalist with the singer Cliff Richard.

Calver had an incredible vocal range, which was remarkable given that he was a cystic fibrosis sufferer.

References

1940s births
2000 deaths
Deaths from cystic fibrosis
20th-century British male singers